Ildar Ruslan-ogly Alekperov (born 27 April 2001) is a Russian professional footballer who plays for Sabah in the Azerbaijan Premier League.

Club career
He made his debut in the Russian Football National League for FC Neftekhimik Nizhnekamsk on 28 October 2020 in a game against FC Krasnodar-2. He substituted Ilya Petrov in the 64th minute.

References

External links
 Profile by Russian Football National League
 

2001 births
Russian sportspeople of Azerbaijani descent
Footballers from Saint Petersburg
Living people
Russian footballers
Association football midfielders
FC Neftekhimik Nizhnekamsk players
Russian First League players
Russian Second League players
FC Strogino Moscow players